Westlake High School is a public high school located in Westlake, Ohio, United States, west of Cleveland. It is the only high school in the Westlake City Schools district. The school principal is Rob Woods.

Campus 
Westlake High School was rebuilt and completed in 2013. The high school features a rotunda housing the cafeteria. Academic wings are divided into two floors, with classrooms grouped in sections. 

The school has one baseball diamond, two softball diamonds, five tennis courts, and a football stadium complete with turf, where Westlake plays in the fall, winter, and spring.

Academics 
Westlake High School offers AP (Advanced Placement), IB (International Baccalaureate), and CCP (College Credit Plus) courses offered through Cuyahoga Community College.

Quality of education 

Ninety-three percent of students who graduate Westlake continue on to a two or four year university.

Sports

Westlake High School has a variety of sports teams that compete in the Great Lakes Conference throughout the school year.

Fall Sports include Football, Cross Country, Golf, Tennis, Soccer, Volleyball, and Cheer.

Winter Sports include Basketball, Gymnastics, Wrestling, Hockey, Swimming & Diving, Cheer, and Bowling.

Spring Sports include Baseball, Softball, Track, Lacrosse, and Tennis.

Mascot 
The school mascot, the Demon, has occasionally caused controversy because of its assumed religious connotations. When Westlake was known as Dover, the school teams were called the "Dover Men". Popular usage shortened this to "D-Men", which when spoken is indistinguishable from the word 'demon', hence the current name.

Arts
Instrumental Music programs include Marching Band, Concert Band, Symphonic Band, Concert Orchestra, Chamber Orchestra, Jazz 1 & Jazz 2. Choral music programs include a show choir, Company D, Symphonic Chorus, Women's Chorus, Men's Chorus, Chorale, and Mixed Choir. In addition, Music Theory and History is also offered at the high school.

Westlake High School "Demon" Marching Band 

The 160-member Westlake High School "Demon" Marching Band provides half time entertainment at every home and away Varsity football games, as well as competitions during the year. 

During the year, students are divided into Symphonic and Concert Band, where both have taken home Superior ratings at the Ohio Music Education Association competitions (in both Class AA and Class C, respectively).

Student media
The Westlake High Broadcasting System (WHBS-TV) is a student-run and faculty-advised cable television station serving the entire Greater Cleveland Metropolitan Area on AT&T U-Verse channel 99 and the city of Westlake on Wide Open West channel 99 and WideOpenWest (WOW!) channel 18. WHBS-TV produces a weekly news show for WHS announcements.

The Green and White is a monthly student newspaper serving Westlake High School.

Notable alumni
 Robert Overmyer, Astronaut
 Logan Paul, YouTuber and professional wrestler 
 Jake Paul, YouTuber and boxer
 Steve Ricchetti, Counselor to the President and former Chief of Staff to the Vice President (2013-2017)

 Dylan Baldi, lead singer and guitarist of the Cloud Nothings

References

External links
 

High schools in Cuyahoga County, Ohio
Public high schools in Ohio
1960 establishments in Ohio